Saphenous branch may refer to:

 Saphenous branch of descending genicular artery
 Saphenous nerve